During the 1997–98 English football season, Norwich City F.C. competed in the Football League First Division.

Season summary
In the 1997–98 season, Norwich had a season of two halves where they had a satisfying first season in which the Canaries were lying in 12th place and 9 points adrift from the playoffs but from the end of January, Norwich went on a poor run of 14 games without a win with only 7 points picked up during that spell and also resulted in Walker resigning at the end of April and ended up finishing in a disappointing 15th place.

Final league table

Results
Norwich City's score comes first

Legend

Football League First Division

FA Cup

League Cup

Players

First-team squad
Squad at end of season

Notes

References

Norwich City F.C. seasons
Norwich City